Summer 1915, Imperial German Army began an Riga–Schaulen offensive and advanced towards Lithuania and Kaunas. The Germans reached Kovno in July 1915. At that time, 66,629 men with 1,370 guns, commanded by Vladimir Grigoriev, manned the fortress. To attack the fortress, the Germans brought four divisions to the operation, which were placed under the command of Karl Litzmann.

Battle

To support this attack, the Germans constructed a railroad to transport their  Gamma-Gerät howitzer. Several days into the siege more guns of various calibers were deployed.

The German army concentrated its attack on the First, Second and Third Forts, which were the complex's oldest structures. The army did not surround the entire fortress, and its defense was able to regroup and resupply. On August 8, the Germans intensified their bombardment, but the fortress garrison withstood several attempts to breach the defensive perimeter. Several days afterward, the bombardment of the fortress reached its peak; its defenders sustained heavy casualty rates of 50% to 75%. On August 14, over 1,000 defending troops were killed, but the Germans were unable to completely overcome the fortress' defenses. However, on the next day, Gamma-Gerät shells destroyed the First Fort and the Germans transferred their attentions to the Second Fort. The fight was now within the confines of the greater fortress complex.

The commander of the Russian 10th Army, E. Radkevich, at noon on August 16, asked Mikhail Alekseyev: how should one regard the Kovno fortress transferred to his subordination: whether to allow it to be completely surrounded by the enemy, whether to defend the northern forts, despite the loss of the fortifications of the forts of the First Department, or start evacuating the garrison, weapons and military supplies, as this must be done in a timely manner. On the morning of August 17, M. Alekseyev allowed the use of his reserve for the defense of Kovno - the 4th Finnish Rifle and 65th Infantry Divisions. E. Radkevich ordered the 3rd Siberian Corps to immediately attack the Germans. In the night battle, the German units that penetrated the forts were driven out, but to the north of the fortress, the detachment of Major General N. Yanovsky was driven back by the German 4th Cavalry Division. From 11 o'clock K. Litzman began shelling the forts of the 1st Defense Department with 208 guns, including 80 heavy and 10 super-heavy howitzers and mortars; fire was corrected from airplanes and balloons. By 12 o'clock, almost all the artillery of the Kovno forts was put out of action, and the infantry of the German 40th reserve corps went on the attack, broke through between forts II and III, and captured fort I by 14 o'clock. By 18 o'clock, all the forts of the 1st division were captured ; in the northern section, the central fence of the fortress was broken through. Bridges across the Neman were occupied by hundreds of Cossacks and prepared for the explosion. 4,000 prisoners and 52 guns fell into the hands of the Germans (115th Infantry, 76th and 79th Reserve Divisions).

The bombardment from siege weapons affected the defenses of Kovno. In the First Department of the fortress, losses reached 75% of the composition (164 officers and 11,968 soldiers), batteries of heavy guns were broken, and anti-assault guns were suppressed. The problem of the defenders was the lack of ammunition: they were armed with Japanese rifles, for which there were no cartridges in Kovno. Grigoriev appealed in vain to the command of the 10th Army, and even on July 31 he decided to send a complaint to the front headquarters: “... Large losses and fatigue of people force people to ask for help, requests for which the 10th Army is silent or is limited by General Popov to incomprehensible polemics ... To replace the melted units, I need 12 whole battalions, at least for the time of putting the garrison units in order. However, the front headquarters forwarded the complaint to the headquarters of the 10th Army.

By the night of August 17, the garrison of the 1st division completely left the Neman, parts of the Second Defense Department left the fortifications under the threat of encirclement. The commandant of the fortress V. Grigoriev was ordered to "take out everything that is possible, lingering on the remaining forts." At about one in the morning, the headquarters of the 10th Army, unable to contact Grigoriev, transferred command of the garrison to the head of the 124th Infantry Division, Infantry General N. Lopushansky, who defended the 4th department of the fortress. It turned out that fort V was still being defended, and fort IV was not occupied by anyone. Bridges across the Neman River were blown up.

At 4 o'clock on August 17, V. Grigoriev telegraphed to the army headquarters that the garrison had left the fortress and was demoralized. E. Radkevich reported this to the Commander-in-Chief of the armies of the North-Western Front M. Alekseyev at 9 o’clock: “The garrison abandoned Kovno and is running in complete disarray. The commandant was found at about 7 o'clock in the morning near Rumšiškės... The remnants of the garrison are a disorderly crowd, and according to the commandant, their moral state excludes the possibility of not only going on the offensive, but even holding any position. K. Litzman, in turn, ordered the bombardment of the center of Kovno, the citadel and the station, the forts in the northern sector of defense, against which the 3rd reserve division and B. von Ezebek's brigade should be sent to attack. Until the evening, the Germans captured the forts of the northern part of the fortress, crossing the 76th and 79th reserve divisions across the Neman River, the 115th Infantry Division captured Fort IV. From 18.30, the Russian 10th Army began to withdraw. The garrison of Kovno held Rumšiškės and Žiežmariai, the detachment of Lieutenant General V. Alftan (65th Infantry Division and militia) continued to defend Fort V. Radkevich still hoped to return Kovno and ordered the corps of V. Tofimov and N. Lopushansky to push back the Germans beyond the Neman, to organize the evacuation of the fortress. The task of recapturing the 3rd and 4th defense departments from the Germans and then defending them “to the last extreme” after midnight on August 18 was also confirmed by M. Alekseyev.

However, overnight in the Kovno area, under the onslaught of the Germans, the 40th and 54th Don Cossack regiments retreated, N. Lopushansky's detachment was also thrown back. In the evening, the Germans captured the last remaining Fort V and completely occupied Kovno. The 40th reserve corps captured up to 20,000 prisoners, 1,300 guns (of which 350 were heavy), 100 machine guns, 20,000 rifles, 810,000 shells.

Outcome
Grigoriev was arrested by Russian authorities, tried, and sentenced to fifteen years in prison for failure to properly perform his duties. He also suffered the revocation of all his awards, military degrees, and honors. The Germans used materials from the fortress elsewhere during their war against Russia.

Researchers have identified factors contributing to the relatively rapid fall of the fortress. It had not been completely renovated; its defenders were inexperienced; the crew had been frequently rotated, and had not been able to familiarize themselves with the surrounding area and with the fortress. Although most of their experience lay in the defense of the fortress' interior, they were dispatched to fight on open ground. When the combat moved outside the fortress, communication lines were disrupted by the German bombardment, and the fortress defense was unable to restore complete communication with the command center or with other forts. The absence of external support was a crucial factor in its fall.

See alsow
 Riga–Schaulen offensive

References

Conflicts in 1915
Battles of the Eastern Front (World War I)
Battles of World War I involving Russia
Battles of World War I involving Germany
1915 in the Russian Empire
February 1915 events
1915 in Germany
History of Kaunas